Edna Guadalupe Carrillo Torres (born 12 November 1991, in Guadalajara, Jalisco) is a judoka from Mexico.

She has two bronze from Pan American Games and some minor medals from national and regional tournaments.

Achievements

References

External links
 
 

Mexican female judoka
Living people
1991 births
Judoka at the 2011 Pan American Games
Judoka at the 2015 Pan American Games
Judoka at the 2019 Pan American Games
Sportspeople from Guadalajara, Jalisco
Pan American Games bronze medalists for Mexico
Judoka at the 2016 Summer Olympics
Olympic judoka of Mexico
Pan American Games medalists in judo
Central American and Caribbean Games gold medalists for Mexico
Central American and Caribbean Games silver medalists for Mexico
Competitors at the 2010 Central American and Caribbean Games
Competitors at the 2014 Central American and Caribbean Games
Central American and Caribbean Games medalists in judo
Medalists at the 2015 Pan American Games
Medalists at the 2019 Pan American Games
20th-century Mexican women
21st-century Mexican women